Aethiophysa is a genus of moths of the family Crambidae.

Species
Aethiophysa acutipennis 
Aethiophysa consimilis 
Aethiophysa crambidalis 
Aethiophysa delicata 
Aethiophysa dichordalis (Hampson, 1912)
Aethiophysa dimotalis 
Aethiophysa dualis 
Aethiophysa extorris (Warren, 1892)
Aethiophysa falcatalis 
Aethiophysa invisalis (Guenée, 1854)
Aethiophysa savoralis (Schaus, 1920)
Aethiophysa surinamensis

References

Glaphyriinae
Crambidae genera
Taxa named by Eugene G. Munroe